Nero Lake is a lake in the Province of Vercelli, Piedmont, Italy. At an elevation of 2672 m, its surface area is 0.087 km².

Lakes of Piedmont
Province of Vercelli